Miika Tenkula (6 March 1974 – 18 February 2009) was a Finnish heavy metal musician. He was the lead guitarist and the main songwriter for the band Sentenced until it disbanded in 2005. He was also the band's original vocalist from 1989 to late 1992.

Death 
After Sentenced disbanded, Tenkula withdrew from publicity. On 18 February 2009 he died, in his home town of Muhos, of a sudden heart attack caused by genetic heart disease. On 22 February, his former band members remembered him in an obituary published on the official Sentenced website as, "a dear friend, a truly remarkable artist and musician, and the very soul of what used to be Sentenced. Rest now, brother – in your music and our hearts you will live forever."

An open memorial was held in the Club Teatria in the city of Oulu on 18 April 2009. The ceremony featured music and a concert film, Buried Alive, which was the band's last concert and had been filmed in the same location in 2005. Music included Tenkula's favourite artists and cover versions from the Sentenced songs by various Finnish artists.

Finnish melodic death metal band Insomnium's song "Weighed Down with Sorrow" from their 2009 album Across the Dark is dedicated to Tenkula.

References 

1974 births
2009 deaths
People from Muhos
Finnish heavy metal guitarists
Alcohol-related deaths in Finland
20th-century guitarists